Ruby Hill is a neighborhood of Denver, Colorado. The neighborhood takes its name from Ruby Hill, a  elevation hill in the neighborhood that overlooks much of South Denver. The hill itself was named for red stones found in the area by early miners, stones that turned out to be garnets.

Boundaries
Ruby Hill is rectangular-shaped neighborhood located in the southwest part of Denver. Its boundaries are:

North: West Mississippi Avenue
East: The South Platte River
South: West Jewell Avenue
West: South Federal Boulevard

Notable spots in Ruby Hill
 Ruby Hill Park occupies much of the eastern part of the neighborhood.
 The Ruby Hill Terrain Park, a part of Ruby Hill Park used for winter sports such as sledding, skiing and snowboarding.
 Ruby Hill Bike Park, a 7.5 acre mountain bike park that includes a slopestyle course, dirt jumps, pump tracks, and a skills course.
Levitt Pavilion Denver, an outdoor concert venue with seating for 7,500, opened in mid-2017.
 Sanderson Gulch Park, an open space park and riparian area centered on a creek that empties into the South Platte River. A public trail follows alongside the creek.

Population
In 2015, the population of Ruby Hill was 10,811. Except for the park and the gulch, most of the neighborhood consists of single-family homes and the businesses along South Federal Boulevard.

References

External links
 Ruby Hill-Godsman Neighborhood Association

Neighborhoods in Denver